Mei-Po Kwan (born 1962) is an American geographer and academic. Her contributions to the field include environmental health, human mobility, transport and health issues in cities, and geographic information science (GIScience).

Career 
Kwan is a Choh-Ming Li Professor of Geography and Resource Management and Director of the Institute of Space and Earth Information Science at the Chinese University of Hong Kong. As a professor, she teaches Advanced GIS, Business Applications of Geographic Information Science, GIS for Social Science and Business Research, and, Design and Implementation for Geographic Information Systems. Her research addresses health, transport, environmental, and social issues in urban areas through the application of innovative geographic information system (GIS) methods.

Kwan coined the terms uncertain geographic context problem (UGCoP) and the neighborhood effect averaging problem (NEAP). She is a leading researcher in deploying real-time GPS tracking and mobile sensing to collect individual-level data in environmental health research. Her recent projects examine the health impacts of individual environmental exposure (e.g., noise, air pollution, green space), the protection of geoprivacy via the development of a Geospatial Virtual Data Enclave (GVDE), and the space-time dynamics of the COVID-19 pandemic.

She has received over US$61.6 million grant support from sources including the U.S. National Institutes of Health, the U.S. National Science Foundation, the U.S. Department of Transportation, the National Natural Science Foundation of China, and the Hong Kong Research Grants Council. She has published over 380 books, journal articles and book chapters. She has delivered over 350 keynote addresses, invited lectures and other invited presentations in more than 20 countries.

Kwan had served as an editor of Annals of the American Association of Geographers for 12 years. She also founded the International Geospatial Health Research Network (IGHRN) in 2013 in an international forum jointly organized by the Chinese University of Hong Kong, Hong Kong Polytechnic University, University of Hong Kong, Utrecht University, the International Association of Chinese Professionals in Geographic Information Sciences (CPGIS), and several other organizations in the U.S. and Europe.

See also 
 Time geography

References

External links 
 

American people of Chinese descent
1962 births
Living people
Academic staff of the Chinese University of Hong Kong
American geographers
Women geographers